Hutridurga, also known as Uttari Betta is a fortified hill in the south-east of Kunigal taluk, rising to 3708 feet above the sea level that is located 15km south-easterly to Kunigal, the Taluk centre. Hutridurga is situated about 65 km west of Bengaluru in the state of Karnataka, in Kunigal taluk, Tumakuru district. It is situated off the Kunigal-Magadi state highway (SH94), at a distance of about 7 km from it and 10 km from the Anchepalya industrial area on the Bengaluru-Mangalore National Highway (India) - NH48 near Kunigal.

Hutridurga was built by Kempegowda in the 16th century. Ruined fortifications are still visible on the two hillocks surrounding the village. Historically, Huthridurga Fort was the military bastion of Tipu Sultan against British, which was conquered by the latter in 1791. It is believed to have been a seven tiered fort and is considered one among the nine "Durgas" (fortified hills) around Bengaluru ("Nava Durgas").  It has a small temple dedicated to Shiva known as the Shankareshwara temple, a Nandi idol on the top of the hill and an Anjaneya temple, midway. Aadi Narayanaswamy and Veerabhadra temples are situated in the village.  The Pooja to the deity is done only on Mondays and Fridays. It saw use as a center of administration during summer and there are structures that housed the war commander, soldiers and a stone umbrella that is said to have been used by Kempegowda himself.

The hill fort has eight gateways from the foot to the summit in addition to several outer gates. On the summit known as Sankarakumbhi is situated a small Shankareshwara temple with a spring called Dodda done or big spring in front of it. From the summit, we get an extensive view of the surrounding landscape dotted by a large number of tanks and hills.
Hutridurga derives its name from Hutri, a village situated about 3 km from the foot of the hill. The village immediately at the foot of the hill is known as Santhepet and that situated on the first elevation as Hutridurga. The Hutridurga village has several temples of Adinarayana, Veerabhadra and Anjaneya etc.

Near Hutridurga is the village of Sondalagere, home to the Kambada Narasimha Swamy (Pillar Narasimha Swamy) temple. The village is situated on Kunigal - Magadi road via Kempanahalli at a distance of 12 km from Kunigal town and connected by bus service. The village has views of Hutidurga hill.

It is a day hike for enthusiasts showcasing the nature at its best and is located close to the state capital of Karnataka, Bengaluru. Wildlife includes a diversity of insects, birds and mammals, including bear, leopard and wild boar. As available infrastructure is basic, there have been discussions about initiating work to build a museum to showcase Kempegowda particularly as it is the only place that has monuments connected personally to the founder of Bengaluru. There have also been demands to improve public transport services to this hobli cum village.. the whole hike is 5 km in distance and can be completed by beginners.

Bloglinks 
Huthridurga Trek - Loapers

Save Huthridurga Fortress - by Summiters Adventures

References 

Hills of Karnataka
Geography of Tumkur district